Felesteen, is a Palestinian Arabic language daily newspaper, based in Gaza.  It is published in broadsheet format. It is the largest circulation daily newspaper in the Gaza Strip and was founded in 2006.

References

External links
 

Anti-Zionism in the Palestinian territories
Arabic-language newspapers
Newspapers published in the State of Palestine
Publications established in 2006